The Quad Cities is a region of cities (originally four, see History) in the U.S. states of Iowa and Illinois: Davenport and Bettendorf in southeastern Iowa, and Rock Island, Moline and East Moline in northwestern Illinois. These cities are the center of the Quad Cities metropolitan area, which as of 2013 had a population estimate of 383,781 and a Combined Statistical Area (CSA) population of 474,937, making it the 90th-largest CSA in the nation.

History

Early history
Before European settlers came to inhabit the Quad Cities, the confluence of rivers had attracted many varying cultures of indigenous peoples, who used the waterways and riverbanks for their settlements for thousands of years.  At the time of European encounter, it was a home and principal trading place of the Sauk and Fox tribes of Native Americans. Saukenuk was the principal village of the Sauk tribe and birthplace of its 19th-century war chief, Black Hawk. In 1832, Sauk chief Keokuk and General Winfield Scott signed a treaty in Davenport after the US defeated the Sauk and their allies in the Black Hawk War. The treaty resulted in the Native Americans ceding  of land to the United States in exchange for a much smaller reservation elsewhere. Black Hawk State Historic Site in Rock Island preserves part of historic Saukenuk and is listed on the National Register of Historic Places.

The history of urban settlements in the Quad Cities was stimulated by riverboat traffic.  For  between LeClaire, Iowa, and Rock Island, the Mississippi River flowed across a series of finger-like rock projections protruding from either bank.  These rapids were difficult for steamboats to traverse.  As demand for river-based transportation increased along the upper Mississippi, the navigability of the river throughout the "Rock Island Rapids" became a greater concern.  Over time, a minor industry grew up in the area to meet the steamboats' needs.  Boat crews needed rest areas to stop before encountering the rapids, places to hire expert pilots such as Phillip Suiter, who was the first licensed pilot on the upper Mississippi River, to guide the boat through the rocky waters, or, when the water was low, places where goods could be removed and transported by wagon on land past the rapids.  Today, the rocks are submerged six feet underwater by a lake formed by two locks and dams.

As the Industrial Revolution developed in the United States, many enterprising industrialists looked to the Mississippi River as a promising source of water power. The combination of energy and easy access to river transportation attracted entrepreneurs and industrialists to the Quad Cities for development. In 1848, John Deere moved his plough business to Moline. His business was incorporated as Deere & Company in 1868.  Deere & Company is the largest employer today in the Quad Cities.

The first railroad bridge built across the Mississippi River connected Davenport and Rock Island in 1856. It was built by the Rock Island Railroad Company, and replaced the slow seasonal ferry service and winter ice bridges as the primary modes of transportation across the river.  Steamboaters saw the nationwide railroads as a threat to their business.  On May 6, 1856, just weeks after completion of the bridge, an angry steamboater crashed the Effie Afton into it. John Hurd, the owner of the Effie Afton, filed a lawsuit against the Rock Island Railroad Company. The Rock Island Railroad Company selected Abraham Lincoln as their trial lawyer and won after he took the case to the US Supreme Court.  Phillip Suiter was one of his expert witnesses.  It was a pivotal trial in Lincoln's career.

Evolution of an identity

After the Civil War, the region began to gain a common identity. The river towns that were thoughtfully planned and competently led flourished, while other settlements, usually get-rich-quick schemes for speculators, failed to pan out. By World War I, the towns of Davenport, Rock Island, and Moline had begun to style themselves as the "Tri-Cities," a cluster of three more-or-less equally-sized river communities growing around the small bend of the Mississippi River where it flows west. But with the growth of Rock Island County, during the 1930s the term "Quad Cities" came into vogue, as East Moline was given "equal status." Despite the fact that the region had earned the name "Quad Cities," the National Basketball Association had a franchise in Moline, Illinois, from 1946 to 1951 called the "Tri-Cities Blackhawks." Then, with the opening of an Alcoa (now Arconic) plant east of Davenport in 1948, the town of Bettendorf underwent so much growth that many people in the community discussed the adoption of the name "Quint Cities",  But by this time, the name "Quad Cities" had become known well beyond the area, and "Quint Cities" never caught on, despite the efforts of WOC-TV (now KWQC-TV) and others. Consequently, when Bettendorf passed East Moline in size, there was some debate about whether Bettendorf had "displaced" East Moline. Instead, local officials, such as the Chamber of Commerce, have chosen an inclusive approach, maintaining the name "Quad Cities" yet including all five cities.

1980s–current
Beginning in the late 1970s, economic conditions caused major industrial restructuring, which disrupted the basis of the region's economy.  The major companies, agricultural manufacturers, ceased or scaled back operations in the Quad Cities. Factories which closed included International Harvester (Navistar) in Rock Island and Case IH in Bettendorf.  Moline-based John Deere cut its labor headcount by one half. Later in the 1980s, Caterpillar Inc. closed its factories at Mount Joy and Bettendorf.

Since the 1990s, the Quad Cities governments, businesses, non-profits and residents have worked hard to redevelop the region.  They have achieved national attention for their accomplishments.

Examples of revitalization and rebirth include:
  Davenport's River Renaissance (a downtown revitalization project that includes a river music history center), an ag-tech venture capital campus, and the Figge Art Museum opened or were completed during the first decade of the 21st century.
 Moline has invested in what was once a robust downtown. The "John Deere Commons" and the Vibrant Arena at The MARK (formerly "The MARK of the Quad Cities", the "iWireless Center", and the "TaxSlayer Center") both opened during the 1990s.
 In 2007, Davenport and Rock Island competed for and won the title of "most livable small city" from the National Council of Mayors, based upon an unfunded proposal called RiverVision.
 In 2008 Bettendorf was ranked by CNN as one of the ten best places to buy a house in the United States.
 In 2010, the Quad Cities were named "the most affordable metro" by Forbes magazine.
 In 2012, Davenport housing market ranked second in the nation beating the housing bubble, due to its lack of foreclosures and their low unemployment.
 In 2012, the Quad Cities Metropolitan Area was ranked among the fastest-growing areas in the nation in the growth of high-tech jobs.
In 2012, the Quad Cities were named the "2012 All American City"
In 2013, Modern Woodman Park was voted the best minor league ballpark in America.

Proposed mergers
Over the years, several communities in the Quad Cities region have proposed or performed mergers. As it grew, Davenport annexed the communities of Rockingham, Nahant, Probstei, East Davenport, Oakdale, Cawiezeel, Blackhawk, Mt. Joy, Green Tree, and others. Bettendorf annexed portions of Pleasant Valley in the 1970s. In 1987, Rock Island, Moline, East Moline, Milan, Carbon Cliff, Hampton, Coal Valley and Silvis considered a super-city merger which would have seen the Illinois cities become the second-largest city in the state, but the proposal ultimately failed. Moline and East Moline considered a merger in 1997. That same year, Green Rock and Colona did merge.

Geography
Interstate 80 crosses the Mississippi River here. The Quad Cities area is distinctive because the Mississippi River flows from east to west as it passes through the heart of the area; the Iowa cities of Davenport and Bettendorf are located due north of Rock Island and Moline, respectively.

The Quad Cities area is one where the telephone companies cooperate with regional phone calls.  Iowa and Illinois have different area codes (563 and 309 respectively), yet most calls originating and terminating within the core urban area are placed without long-distance charges by dialing just a 7-digit number.  This helps the bi-state area promote itself as a single community, "joined by a river."

The Quad Cities Metropolitan Area consists of three counties: Scott County in Iowa, and Rock Island County and Henry County in Illinois. The Quad City metro population is 382,268. The Quad Cities Metropolitan Area is also considered part of the Great Lakes Megalopolis.

Demographics
According to the 2010 United States Census Count, the metropolitan area grew to 471,551. As of the 2000 census, a total of 96,495 households and 60,535 families resided in the area.

Race and ethnicity
The racial makeup of the area is 90.6% White (410,861), 3.7% Black or African American (27,757), 0.6% American Indian and Alaskan Native (1,255), 1.0%  Asian (6,624), 0.03% Pacific Islander (156), and 2.0% from two or more races (11,929). 7.1% of the population is Hispanic or Latino of any race (37,070). The predominant ethnicities in the Quad Cities are of northern European descent, including German, Irish, and English, as well Scandinavian (Mostly Swedish and Norwegian) and Dutch. The primary minority groups in the area are African-Americans, which in Davenport make up the third largest black population in the state of Iowa, a community dating back to the 1830s when Iowa was a free territory. Many of the city's African-American residents have roots in the Southern/Border states of the U.S., including Mississippi, Arkansas, Alabama, and Missouri. The most significant Asian-American populations are South Asian and Vietnamese American.

Religion
According to resources, Christianity is the largest religion to be practiced in the area. However, the two states have a different population of Christian groups. In Davenport and Bettendorf, Catholics make up an 18.5% plurality, but Protestants with 15.1% Mainline and 11.6% Evangelical make up large minorities as well. The Black Protestants on the Iowa side comes in at 1.2%. On the Illinois side, between Rock Island, Moline, and East Moline, Catholicism is less prevalent at 12.4%, and at 12.5% Evangelical and 11.0% Mainline have smaller declines.

The Jewish population is about 500–600, which is down from about 1,800–2,000 in the 1950s and 1960s.

Landmarks

 The business Antique Archeology, featured on the History Channel show American Pickers, is located in LeClaire
 Brady Street Stadium, a major high-school sports venue along Davenport's Brady Street (U.S. 61)
 The Col Ballroom, a small arena for music concerts, in Davenport
 Davenport Skybridge
 Figge Art Museum, Davenport, formerly the Davenport Museum of Art, designed by British architect David Chipperfield and opened in 2005. Its holdings include extensive collections of Haitian, colonial Mexican and Midwestern art, particularly pieces by Thomas Hart Benton, Marvin Cone and Grant Wood, and personal effects from Wood's estate.
 Fred Schwengel Memorial Bridge, a four-lane steel-girder bridge on Interstate 80, crossing the Mississippi River to connect LeClaire and Rapids City. Opened in 1966.
 Government Bridge, a double-decked bridge adjacent to Lock and Dam 15, carrying motor and rail traffic between Arsenal Island and Davenport. The 1896 truss bridge, about 1,950 feet long, includes a 360-degree swing span over the twin locks. It connects to the Illinois side of the river via the Rock Island Viaduct.
 Iowa 80 Truck Stop – the world's largest truck stop is along Interstate 80 near Walcott, Iowa, west of Davenport.
 Interstate 74 Bridge, formerly known as the "Iowa-Illinois Memorial Bridge", connecting Bettendorf and Moline. The twin suspension spans across the Mississippi River were built in 1935 and 1959 and adapted to carry Interstate 74 in the early 1970s. The twinned towers are a symbol of the two-state Quad Cities community. The bridge is set to be replaced with eight lanes.
 John Deere Pavilion, a small museum and showcase for John Deere equipment, built adjacent to the John Deere Commons in the 1990s in downtown Moline.
 John Deere World Headquarters, designed by Eero Saarinen and completed in 1963 in Moline.
 The John Looney Mansion, designed and built in 1897 for the attorney, publisher and gangster John Looney in Rock Island which still stands off 20th Street and 17th Avenue.
 Lock and Dam No. 15, a 1,200-foot roller dam with twin locks across the Mississippi River between Arsenal Island and Davenport. The roller dam, billed as the longest of its type, maintains a pool upstream that allows river traffic to pass through the once notorious Rock Island Rapids.
 Mississippi Valley Fairgrounds, a fair and exposition venue in Davenport
 Modern Woodmen Park, formerly John O'Donnell Stadium, home of the Kansas City Royals' class high A affiliate, the Quad Cities River Bandits, on the Davenport riverfront. With the lights of Rock Island across the Mississippi and the Centennial Bridge looming just beyond the right-field fence, the park was named by USA Today as one of 10 great places for a baseball pilgrimage. The ball park added a 110 ft. ferris wheel before the start of the 2014 season.
 Old Main, completed in 1888, the oldest building on the campus of Augustana College. Located on a bluff overlooking the Mississippi River, its iconic and newly renovated dome was lighted as of October 2011.
 Putnam Museum in Davenport
 Quad City Botanical Center in Rock Island
 Quad Cities Waterfront Convention Center, located in Bettendorf
 RiverCenter/Adler Theatre, a convention and performing-arts complex in Davenport. The 2,400-seat Adler is the former RKO Orpheum Theater, which opened in 1931, designed by A.S. Graven of Chicago, whose projects included the Drake Hotel in Chicago and the Paramount Theater in New York City. The theater was extensively renovated and expanded in 1984–86 and 2005.
 River Music Experience, a performance, education and music-history venue in the Redstone Building, the former Petersen Harned Von Maur department store
 Rock Island Arsenal, manufacturer of military equipment and ordnance since the 1880s, now the largest government-owned weapons manufacturing arsenal in the United States. The arsenal is located on Arsenal Island (formerly known as Rock Island) in the Mississippi River between Davenport, Iowa, and Rock Island, Illinois. Fort Armstrong was built there in 1816. During the civil war, the island held a Union prison camp for Confederate soldiers. The Federal-style home of Colonel George Davenport, built in 1833–34, the oldest extant building in the Quad Cities, is on the north bank of the island.
 Rock Island Centennial Bridge over the Mississippi River between downtown Davenport and Rock Island, completed in 1940 to commemorate Rock Island's 100th anniversary. The five arches of the 3,853-foot through-arch bridge often are used as a symbol of the Quad Cities.
 Rock Island County Fairgrounds in East Moline, also the site of the Quad City Speedway
 Rock Island Auction Company from the Discovery Channel show Ready, Aim, Sold!
 Vibrant Arena at The MARK – a 12,000-seat arena in Moline (formerly The Mark of the Quad Cities, the iWireless Center, and the TaxSlayer Center).
 Vander Veer Botanical Park is a 33-acre (130,000 m2) botanical garden in the Vander Veer Park Historic District of Davenport, Iowa. It is believed to be one of the first botanical parks west of the Mississippi River.
 The Quarter – a  site in East Moline, alongside the Mississippi River, featuring shops, restaurants, condominiums, boat docks, sports and interpretive centers, and a working lighthouse, currently under development.
 Chicago, Milwaukee, St. Paul and Pacific Freight House, referred to locally as the "Freight House", is an entertainment venue
TBK Bank Sports Complex, also known as the BettPlex, is a state-of-the-art sport and entertainment complex. Containing eight full-size volleyball and basketball courts. Four indoor and five outdoor sand volleyball courts, 10 lighted outdoor baseball and softball fields, the BettPlex is a 45 million dollar sporting facility that was created to host weekend sporting tournaments in the Quad Cities.

Noteworthy companies

 Arconic
 Cobham plc
 Deere & Company (also known as/branded: John Deere)
 Genesis Health System
 Group O
 Guardian Industries
 Happy Joe's
 KONE, Inc (formerly Montgomery Elevator)
 Lee Enterprises
 Lewis Machine and Tool Company
 Modern Woodmen of America
 Nestlé Purina PetCare
 QCR Holdings
 Sears Seating (also known as Sears Manufacturing)
 Von Maur
 Whitey's Ice Cream

Top employers
According to Quad Cities website, the top employers in the Quad Cities area are:

Notable people

Eddie Albert, actor, Rock Island
Ken Anderson, football player and coach, Rock Island
Pat Angerer, football player, Bettendorf
Matthew Ashford, actor, Davenport
Tavian Banks, football player, Bettendorf
Bonnie Bartlett, actress, Moline
Scott Beck, filmmaker, Bettendorf
Bix Beiderbecke, jazz musician, Davenport
Louis Bellson, drummer, Moline
Vincent Hugo Bendix, inventor and industrialist, Moline
Ken Berry, actor, Moline
Joseph W. Bettendorf, industrialist, Bettendorf (Gilbert)
William P. Bettendorf, industrialist, Bettendorf (Gilbert)
Chief Black Hawk, band leader and warrior of the Sauk Native American tribe
Isabel Bloom, artist, Davenport
Lisa Bluder, basketball coach, Marion
Suzy Bogguss, country singer, Aledo
Ken Bowman, football player, Milan
Lara Flynn Boyle, actress, Davenport
Ambrose Burke, priest and college president, Davenport
Mike Butcher, pitcher and coach, Davenport
Branden Campbell, bassist for the Neon Trees, Davenport
Louise Carver, actress, Davenport
Samuel Franklin Cody, aviator, Davenport
William F. "Buffalo Bill" Cody, pioneer, LeClaire
Danielle Colby, reality star American Pickers, Davenport/LeClaire
Jude Cole, musician, Carbon Cliff
Martin Cone, priest and college president, Davenport
Ed Conroy, basketball coach, Davenport
George Cram Cook, author, Davenport
Roger Craig, football player, Davenport
Doris Davenport, actress, Moline
 Colonel George Davenport, pioneer, US Army officer
Dana Davis, actress, Davenport
Ricky Davis, basketball player, Davenport
John Deere, inventor, Moline
Frederick Denkmann, lumber baron, Rock Island
Justin Diercks, racecar driver, Davenport
Acie Earl, basketball player, Moline
Eugene Burton Ely, aviation pioneer, Davenport
Embassy, Music Producer, Moline
Bill Fitch, NBA basketball player and coach, Davenport
John Flannagan, priest and college president, Davenport
Jack Fleck, golfer, 1955 U.S. Open champion, Bettendorf
Joe Frisco, vaudeville performer, Davenport
John Getz, actor, Davenport
Susan Glaspell, writer, Davenport
Ethan Happ, Big Ten basketball player, Milan
Warren Hearnes, governor of Missouri, Moline
Austin Howard, football player, Davenport
Jim Jensen, NFL running back, Davenport

Jesse Johnson (musician), The Time, Rock Island
Mark Johnson, Olympic wrestler, Rock Island
James Jones, football player, Davenport
Gail Karp, cantor of the Reform Jewish synagogue, Davenport
Hazel Keener, actress, Bettendorf and Davenport
Madison Keys, tennis player, Rock Island
Josh Kroeger, athlete, Davenport
Steve Kuberski, basketball player, Moline
Perry Lafferty, producer, Davenport
Elmer Layden, athlete and coach, Davenport
Jim Leach, politician, Davenport
Johnny Lujack, quarterback, 1947 Heisman Trophy winner, Bettendorf
Sue Lyon, actress, Davenport
Helen Mack, actress, Rock Island
Cletus Madsen, priest and college president, Davenport
Stuart Margolin, actor and director, Davenport
Elisabeth Maurus, musician, Rock Island
Carl Meinberg, priest and college president, Davenport
Sebastian Menke, priest and college president, Davenport
Julia Michaels, musician, Davenport
Pat Miletich, MMA fighter, Bettendorf
Marvin Mottet, priest, Davenport
Don Nelson, NBA basketball player and coach, Rock Island
Michael Nunn, boxer, Davenport
Spike O'Dell, radio personality, East Moline
Gerald Francis O'Keefe, priest, Davenport
Gene Oliver, MLB player, Rock Island
Eric Christian Olsen, actor, Bettendorf
Daniel David Palmer, chiropractor, Davenport
Oran Pape, state patrol, Davenport
Laurdine Patrick, musician, East Moline
Mary Beth Peil, actress and singer, Davenport
Nat Pendleton, wrestler and actor, Davenport
Roger Perry, actor, Davenport
James Philbrook, actor, Davenport
Scott Pose, MLB baseball player, Davenport
Hiram Price, politician, Davenport
Margo Price, country singer, Aledo
Linnea Quigley, actress and producer, Davenport
Ed Reimers, announcer, Moline
Otto Frederick Rohwedder, engineer, inventor of sliced bread, Davenport
Seth Rollins, WWE wrestler, Davenport
Randy Shilts, journalist, Davenport
Jim Skinner, CEO of McDonald's, Davenport
Dean Stone, MLB pitcher, Silvis
Tim Sylvia, MMA fighter, Bettendorf
Jason Tanamor, author, writer, Rock Island
Julian Vandervelde, football player, Davenport
Hynden Walch, actress, Davenport
Henry Cantwell Wallace, U.S. Secretary of Agriculture, Rock Island
Friedrich Weyerhäuser, lumber baron, Rock Island
Dwight Deere Wiman, Broadway producer, Moline
Bryan Woods, filmmaker, Bettendorf

Education

Colleges and universities
 Augustana College – A private, four-year liberal arts college in Rock Island.
 Bible Missionary Institute – A Bible college in Rock Island affiliated with the Bible Missionary Church.
 Black Hawk College – Community college in Moline, with a satellite campus in Kewanee, Illinois.
 Eastern Iowa Community College District – Consisting of campuses in Bettendorf, Clinton, and Muscatine. Bettendorf's campus is known as Scott Community College.
 Palmer Chiropractic College – Davenport, first chiropractic school in the world.
 Saint Ambrose University - A university in Davenport.
 Upper Iowa University – A satellite campus in Bettendorf.
 Western Illinois University-Quad Cities – The only public, four-year university in the Quad Cities region. The campus is located in Moline along the Mississippi Riverfront at the former site of the  John Deere Technical Site.

Culture
Since 1916, the region has supported the Quad City Symphony Orchestra, which presents a year-round schedule of concerts at the Adler Theatre in Davenport and Centennial Hall in Rock Island. The Handel Oratorio Society, dating to 1880, is the second-oldest organization of its kind in the nation and presents annual performances of "Messiah" along with another major work for choir and orchestra. The Augustana Choir, founded at Rock Island's Augustana College in 1934, is one of the nation's leading collegiate choruses. Major outdoor summer music festivals include the Bix Beiderbecke Memorial Jazz Festival, Mississippi Valley Blues Festival, and River Roots Live.

The Quad Cities' three traditional community theaters – Playcrafters Barn Theatre (founded in 1920, comedies and dramas) and Quad City Music Guild (1948, musicals) in Moline, and Genesius guild (1957, outdoor Shakespeare and Greek comedies and tragedies) in Rock Island – were joined in 1976 by Circa '21 Dinner Playhouse, a professional dinner theater in downtown Rock Island's historic Fort Theatre. Ballet is performed at Ballet Quad Cities. ComedySportz provides improv comedy. Bluebox Limited is a Bettendorf-based film production company, and many outside productions companies have filmed movies in the Quad Cities in recent years.  Historic buildings and sites listed on state and the National Register of Historic Places interpret the history of people's settlement and lives in the area.

Media

The Quad Cities is the 151st largest radio market in the United States. It is ranked 97th by Nielsen Media Research for the 2008–09 television season with 309,600 television households.

The area is served by over 13 commercial radio stations, 8 non-commercial radio stations, 3 low power FM radio stations, 8 TV stations and 3 daily newspapers.

In 2012, the Mississippi Valley Fair that is held in Davenport served as the film location for Rodney Atkins' music video "Just Wanna Rock N' Roll."

Also in 2012, the PBS Frontline documentary Poor Kids was filmed in and around the Quad Cities showing poverty from a child's perspective.

Transportation

Four interstate highways serve the Quad Cities: Interstate 80, Interstate 280, Interstate 74 serve both states while Interstate 88 serves just Illinois. United States highways include U.S. Route 6 and U.S. Route 67 which run through both Iowa and Illinois, while U.S. Route 61 serves just Iowa and U.S. Route 150 serves just Illinois.

A total of five bridges accessible by automobiles connect Iowa with Illinois in the Quad Cities across the Mississippi River. The Fred Schwengel Memorial Bridge carries Interstate 80 and connects Le Claire, Iowa, with Rapids City, Illinois. Continuing downstream, the I-74 Bridge connects Bettendorf, Iowa, with Moline, Illinois, and is the busiest bridge with an average of 70,400 cars a day. The Government Bridge connects Downtown Davenport with the Rock Island Arsenal. Three bridges connect Davenport with Rock Island, Illinois; The Rock Island Centennial Bridge, The Crescent Rail Bridge, and the furthest downstream bridge, the Sergeant John F. Baker, Jr. Bridge which carries I-280.

Several state highways also serve the area. Iowa Highway 22 is on Davenport's southwest side and runs west through the county, while Iowa Highway 130 runs along Northwest Boulevard on Davenport's north edge. Illinois Route 5 (John Deere Road) runs from Rock Island east till it runs into Interstate 88. Illinois Route 92 runs along the Mississippi River, while Illinois Route 84 runs along the east side of Rock Island County. Illinois Route 192 connects Highway 92 with Illinois Route 94 near Taylor Ridge. The Chicago – Kansas City Expressway also serves the area along Interstates 74, 80, and 88.

There are three transit operators in the Quad Cities with limited interconnection between them. Rock Island County Metropolitan Mass Transit District (Quad Cities MetroLINK) serves the Illinois cities of Rock Island, Moline, East Moline, Milan, Silvis, Carbon Cliff, Hampton and Colona. It has 12 routes and a fleet of about 52 buses. It operates a river craft during summer months. In Iowa, Davenport Citibus has 10 fixed routes and operates 20 buses, seven days a week and Bettendorf Transit operates three routes, Monday–Saturday, and has eight buses.

Amtrak currently does not serve the Quad Cities. In 2008, United States Senators Tom Harkin, Chuck Grassley, Dick Durbin, and Barack Obama sent a letter to Amtrak asking them to begin plans to bring rail service to the Quad Cities. In October 2010, a $230 million federal fund was announced that will bring Amtrak service to the Quad Cities, with a new line running from Moline to Chicago. They hoped to have the line completed in 2015, and offer two round trips daily to Chicago.

In December 2011, the federal government awarded $177 million in funding for the Amtrak connection. Budgetary and logistical issues have delayed the completion of all necessary track improvements, but the project is still in development. The multi-modal Moline Q Station building was completed in early 2018, with the attached Westin Element hotel opening in February. When the full project is completed, it will establish passenger rail through the Quad Cities, for the first time since the 1970s.

The Quad Cities is served by the Quad Cities International Airport, Illinois' third-busiest airport, located in Moline. The smaller Davenport Municipal Airport is the home of the Quad City Air Show.

Sports
From 1907 to 1926, Rock Island was home to the NFL's Rock Island Independents.  The franchise was a charter member on the National Football League (NFL) in 1920. The first NFL Game ever was played by the Independents at Douglas Park in September 1920. Football legend Jim Thorpe was a member of the team in 1924.

The Tri-Cities Blackhawks, named in honor of the Sauk war chief Black Hawk, was the next top-level professional sports franchise.  The club played in the National Basketball League (NBL) from 1946 until its merger in 1949 with the Basketball Association of America to become the National Basketball Association (NBA). Hall of famer Red Auerbach coached the Blackhawks during their first NBA season.

After the 1950–51 basketball season, the team moved to Milwaukee, where they were named the Hawks. After a second move to St. Louis, the team is now the Atlanta Hawks.

Professional basketball returned to the Quad Cities during the 1980s and 1990s with the Quad City Thunder of the Continental Basketball Association.  The CBA served as the NBA's premier developmental league and produced many highly regarded NBA stars.  From 1987 through the 1992–93 season, the Thunder played at Wharton Field House in Moline. Starting with the 1993–94 season, the team played at The MARK of the Quad Cities (now the Vibrant Arena at The MARK.) After the CBA folded in 2001, the Thunder franchise ceased operations permanently. Vibrant Arena at The MARK occasionally hosts NCAA Division I college basketball conference tournaments as well as NBA and NHL exhibitions.

The Quad Cities has hosted minor league baseball teams since the Davenport Brown Stockings first played in 1878. The Rock Island Islanders and Moline Plowboys each fielded teams for many seasons. The Islanders began play in 1901 and played primarily at Douglas Park. The Plowboys were founded in 1914. Their home was Browning Field.

The Davenport franchise has been a member of the Midwest League since 1960. They have played at Modern Woodmen Park since 1931. Today, the Quad Cities River Bandits are High Class A affiliate of the Kansas City Royals

The PGA Tour makes an annual stop in the Quad Cities.  The golf tournament is currently known as the John Deere Classic.  It has drawn dozens of top PGA players over the years, including Tiger Woods, Vijay Singh, and Payne Stewart.

The Quad Cities Marathon has run annually in late September since 1998. Roughly 400-500 participants race through the four cities, beginning and ending in Moline. The race weekend also offers a half marathon and a 5K as well as races for children. Kenyan Kiplangat Terer holds the men's record with a 2:14:04, run in 2013. Ethiopian Hirut Guangul holds the woman's record at 2:35:07, from her 2012 win.

Sports teams

Quad City River Bandits is a Class A Midwest League minor league baseball team in Davenport. Their home games are played at Modern Woodmen Park, formerly John O'Donnell Stadium. The Davenport team has existed under a variety of names and Major League Baseball team affiliations since 1901. The River Bandits are currently affiliated with the Kansas City Royals.
Quad City Mallards were an ice hockey team that played from 2009 to 2018 with home games held at the Vibrant Arena at The MARK in Moline. The new Mallards replaced the former Quad City Flames AHL team which played from 2007 to 2009. The original Mallards played in the United Hockey League from 1995 to 2007.
 The Quad City Storm was launched for the 2018–19 season in the Southern Professional Hockey League.
 The Quad City Steamwheelers were an AF2 arena football franchise that also played at the Vibrant Arena at The MARK. The Steamwheelers won the league's title game, the ArenaCup, in 2000 and 2001. After the AF2 league folded following its 2009 season, the Steamwheelers also ceased operations.
 A new Quad City Steamwheelers organization launched for the 2018 season in Champions Indoor Football and then moved to the Indoor Football League for 2019.
 Quad City Silverbacks were a professional mixed martial arts team competing in the now-defunct International Fight League. Home matches took place at the Vibrant Arena at The MARK.
 Pat Miletich formed and based a mixed martial arts gym and fight team, Miletich Fighting Systems, in the Quad Cities. Miletich Fighting Systems is among MMA's first 'super-camps', and housed many of the consensus greatest fighters of the early 2000s, such as Jens Pulver, Matt Hughes, Robbie Lawler, Tim Sylvia, and Jeremy Horn, among others. 
 The Quad City Riverhawks was a PBL (Premier Basketball League) team. They played home games at Wharton Field House in Moline during the 2008 season.  They ended with that season. Previously, the Quad City Thunder were a CBA team playing in the late 1980s thru 2000, first at Wharton and then at The Mark.
 The Quad City Raiders are a semi-professional minor league football team that was formed in 2011 to serve the Quad City area. The Raiders play in the MidStates Football League and have reached the semi-finals in the league playoffs each season.

See also
Mississippi Athletic Conference for Iowa high school sports, and Western Big 6 Conference for high school sports in Illinois.

See also
 African Americans in Davenport, Iowa
 Wild Dog (comics)
 Quad City-style pizza
 List of tallest buildings in the Quad Cities

Notes

References

External links

 QuadCities.com – Local information guide, business directory, event calendar
 Quad Cities Convention & Visitors Bureau
 Quad City Times newspaper
 Quad-Cities Online – Local information
 QCANews.com

 
Metropolitan areas of Iowa
Metropolitan areas of Illinois